Pope Peter VI of Alexandria (Abba Petros VI), 104th Pope of Alexandria & Patriarch of the See of St. Mark.

18th-century Coptic Orthodox popes of Alexandria
Year of birth missing
1726 deaths